The Minnesota Historical Society (MNHS) is a nonprofit educational and cultural institution dedicated to preserving the history of the U.S. state of Minnesota. It was founded by the territorial legislature in 1849, almost a decade before statehood. The Society is named in the Minnesota Constitution. It is headquartered in the Minnesota History Center in downtown Saint Paul.

Although its focus is on Minnesota history it is not constrained by it. Its work on the North American fur trade has been recognized in Canada as well.

MNHS holds a collection of nearly 550,000 books, 37,000 maps, 250,000 photographs, 225,000 historical artifacts, 950,000 archaeological items,  of manuscripts,  of government records, 5,500 paintings, prints and drawings; and 1,300 moving image items.

MNopedia: The Minnesota Encyclopedia, is since 2011 an online "resource for reliable information about significant people, places, events, and things in Minnesota history", that is funded through a Legacy Amendment Arts and Cultural Heritage Fund grant and administered by the Minnesota Historical Society. The Minnesota Historical Society Press (MNHS Press) publishes books on the history and culture of Minnesota and the Upper Midwest with the goal of advancing research, supporting education, and sharing diverse perspectives on Minnesota history. MNHS Press is the oldest publishing company in the state of Minnesota and the largest historical society press in the nation, with more than 500 books in print. MNHS Press also produces the quarterly magazine, Minnesota History (journal).

History

The Minnesota Historical Society was established on October 20, 1849 as the fifth act of the Minnesota Territorial Legislature. The Society was established earlier than was common for historical societies in other states. As Territorial Governor, Alexander Ramsey recommended saving every newspaper published in the Minnesota Territory. Ramsey stated "the preservation by a community, of materials for the composition of its history, when a future time shall require it to be written, is a task not without its uses; and, when early commenced, easily accomplished." Charles K. Smith, the first Secretary of the Minnesota Territory, drew up the act and following the Society's charter, Smith and 18 other incorporators formally organized the Society on November 15, 1849.

Upon organization, the Society had no headquarters. The Society initially used the Territorial Secretary's office, hotel rooms, and store lofts. In 1855, the Society was granted a room in the Minnesota State Capitol. Enabled by an 1856 amendment to the Society's charter allowing the Society to own unlimited property, the Society began a capital campaign to fund the construction of its own building..

Daniel A. Robertson, former editor and proprietor of the Minnesota Democrat served as chairman of the building committee. Robertson raised $1,500 via the sale of sixty-two lifetime memberships to the Society in order to fund the acquisition of two lots to serve as the site of a building to house the society. On expectation that fundraising would continue at a similar place, plans were made to begin a two-year building construction On June 24, 1856, the Society held a gala with invitations sent to scientific and literary guests from across the nation to celebrate the laying of the cornerstone of the building. The gala was reported in the Pioneer and Democrat as the "grandest gala day in the history of our city". Two weeks later, the building committee had exhausted their funds and passed a resolution to assess annual members five dollars in order to pay for the protection of the building foundation against winter frosts at the cost of $100. The society approved a search for an architect who could draft a structure that could be built for $15,000 or less. Following the protection of the foundation, work on the building ceased as the Panic of 1857 resulted in the impoverishment of many formerly wealthy Minnesotans.

The Society would continue to operate out of the Capitol until the Minnesota State Legislature appropriated $500,000 for the construction of a fireproof historical building via an act passed in 1913 and amended in 1915. The building was completed in 1917 and the Society finished the process of moving its collections on March 1, 1918. The building currently serves as the Minnesota Judicial Center. The Society moved to its current location, the Minnesota History Center, in 1992.

State historic sites
The Minnesota Historical Society operates 31 historic sites and museums, 26 of which are open to the public.  MNHS manages 16 sites directly and 7 in partnerships where the society maintains the resources and provides funding. 6 sites are being held for preservation but are closed to public access, and five are self-guided sites with interpretive signage. Seven of the sites are National Historic Landmarks and 16 others are on the National Register of Historic Places (NRHP).  Seven sites lie within Minnesota state parks, and three are elements of the Mississippi National River and Recreation Area.

Document depositories 

These publications are described in more detail in an online format (without the downloadable document formats available above), at the MHC's own Digital History Books page (Retrieved November 24, 2012)

References

External links

Minnesota Historical Society
Placeography – wiki operated by the Minnesota Historical Society

 
State historical societies of the United States
1849 establishments in Minnesota Territory
Historical societies in Minnesota
Museum organizations
State archives of the United States